Doniphan Township is an inactive township in Ripley County, in the U.S. state of Missouri.

Doniphan Township was erected in 1871, taking its name from the community of Doniphan, Missouri.

References

Townships in Missouri
Townships in Ripley County, Missouri